Seghwaert is a district in Zoetermeer that was formed around the old village of Zegwaart (or Zegwaard), which fused with the municipality of Zoetermeer in 1935, using the archaic spelling of the locale's name. The old Zegwaart was a ribbon development along what remains until today as Zegwaartseweg, which is perpendicular to Dorpstraat. The district is divided into Seghwaert-Oost (2723), -Midden (2724) and -Noord (2727).

In the Middle Ages Zegwaart and Zoetermeer formed a parish. The coat of arms of the municipality was of azure, with three slanting bars of silver.

Notable people from Seghwaert
 Jan van Leeuwen (1850-1924), Professor of Greek language and literature at Leiden
 Silvia de Groot (1918-2009), cultural anthropologist / surinamist

References

External links
Seghwaert Zoning Plan

Former municipalities of South Holland

nl:Seghwaert